Gibbs House is a historic home located at Beaufort, Carteret County, North Carolina. It was built about 1851, and is a two-story, five bay by four bay, nearly square Greek Revival style dwelling. It features a two-tier porch with four paneled posts.  The house was used in the 1880s by marine scientists from the Johns Hopkins University. The Johns Hopkins Seaside Laboratory operated here for some ten years, probably the first school of marine biology in the United States.

It was listed on the National Register of Historic Places in 1973.

References

Johns Hopkins University
Houses on the National Register of Historic Places in North Carolina
Greek Revival houses in North Carolina
Houses completed in 1851
Houses in Carteret County, North Carolina
National Register of Historic Places in Carteret County, North Carolina
1851 establishments in North Carolina